Claytonia scammaniana is a species of flowering plant in the genus Claytonia, found in the mountains of Alaska and Yukon. The species has been subject of differing taxonomic opinions and confusion with Claytonia arctica and C. sarmentosa. A taxonomic revision including a review of previous studies of Claytonia scammaniana was published in 2006.

References

External links

Flora North America Treatment

scammaniana
Plants described in 1939